Lannea is a genus of plants in the family Anacardiaceae.

Taxonomy

Species
, Plants of the World online has 36 accepted species:
{|
|- valign=top
|
 Lannea acida A.Rich.
 Lannea acuminata 
 Lannea alata (Engl.) Engl.
 Lannea ambacensis (Hiern) Engl.
 Lannea angolensis R.Fern. & Mendes
 Lannea antiscorbutica (Hiern) Engl.
 Lannea asymmetrica 
 Lannea barteri (Oliv.) Engl.
 Lannea chevalieri 
 Lannea cinerascens 
 Lannea coromandelica (Houtt.) Merr.
 Lannea cotoneaster 
 Lannea discolor (Sond.) Engl.
 Lannea edulis (Sond.) Engl.
 Lannea fruticosa (Hochst. ex A. Rich.) Engl.
 Lannea fulva (Engl.) Engl.
 Lannea glabrescens 
 Lannea gossweileri Exell & Mendonça
|
 Lannea humilis (Oliv.) Engl.
 Lannea katangensis 
 Lannea ledermannii 
 Lannea malifolia 
 Lannea microcarpa 
 Lannea nigritana 
 Lannea obovata 
 Lannea rivae 
 Lannea rubra (Hiern) Engl.
 Lannea schimperi (Hochst. ex A.Rich.) Engl.
 Lannea schweinfurthii (Engl.) Engl.
 Lannea tibatensis 
 Lannea transulta 
 Lannea triphylla 
 Lannea velutina A.Rich.
 Lannea virgata 
 Lannea welwitschii (Hiern) Engl.
 Lannea zastrowiana 
|}

Possible synonyms of other species:
 Lannea transulta (Balf.f.) Radcl.-Sm.
 Lannea triphylla (syn. L. somalensis & L. cinerea'')

References

External links
 

 
Anacardiaceae genera
Taxonomy articles created by Polbot